Conus cargilei is a species of sea snail, a marine gastropod mollusk in the family Conidae, the cone snails, cone shells or cones.

These snails are predatory and venomous. They are capable of "stinging" humans.

Description
The size of the shell varies between 11 mm and 30 mm.

Distribution
This marine species occurs by the Abrolhos Archipelago in the Atlantic ocean, off Brazil's southern Bahia coast.

References

 Coltro, J., Jr. 2004. New species of Conidae from northeastern Brazil (Mollusca: Gastropoda). Strombus 11: 1-16
 Puillandre N., Duda T.F., Meyer C., Olivera B.M. & Bouchet P. (2015). One, four or 100 genera? A new classification of the cone snails. Journal of Molluscan Studies. 81: 1-23

External links
 World Register of Marine Species
 Cone Shells - Knights of the Sea

cargilei
Gastropods described in 2004